Ralph E. Barclay Sr. (September 11, 1903 – October 18, 1958) was an American football, basketball and track coach.

He served as the head men's basketball coach at Western Illinois University (then known as Western Illinois Normal School) in Macomb, Illinois from 1926 to 1929.

He served as the head football coach at McKendree College from 1948 to 1949.

References

External links
 

1903 births
1958 deaths
McKendree Bearcats football coaches
Western Illinois Leathernecks men's basketball coaches